Magothy Bay Natural Area Preserve is a  Natural Area Preserve located in Northampton County, Virginia. The preserve encompasses woodlands, wetlands, and salt marshes, providing foraging areas for various species of waterfowl, shorebirds, and wading birds.  Diamondback terrapins and clapper rails are frequent visitors, as are many varieties of songbird.

The preserve is owned and maintained by the Virginia Department of Conservation and Recreation, and is open to the public. Improvements at the preserve include a parking area and two hiking trails.

See also
 List of Virginia Natural Area Preserves

References

External links
Virginia Department of Conservation and Recreation: Magothy Bay Natural Area Preserve

Virginia Natural Area Preserves
Protected areas of Northampton County, Virginia